Burn Slow is the debut extended play (EP) by American singer-songwriter Jaira Burns. It was released on July 27, 2018 via Interscope Records. The project was preceded by the singles "Burn Slow", "Okokok", "Sugarcoat" and "Low Key in Love", which were released on August 11, 2017, March 9, May 11 and June 15, 2018, respectively.

Background and promotion
On June 16, 2017, Burns released her debut single, "Ugly" which was featured in a commercial for Beats Electronics and Balmain headphone collaboration starring Kylie Jenner. An accompanying music video for the track, directed by Wiissa was released on June 28. However, it was ultimately removed from the final track listing. On August 11, she released the lead single of the record titled "Burn Slow". The music video directed by Alexandra Gavillet was later released on September 6. On October 20, she released another single titled "High Rollin", which was removed from the final track listing as well. On March 9, she released the second single titled "Okokok", and on May 2, 2018 the music video directed by Lucy Sandler was released. On May 11, she released the third single titled "Sugarcoat" and on June 6, a music video directed by Sophia Ray was released. On June 15, the fourth single titled "Low Key in Love" was released.

Critical reception
Michael Love Michael of Papermag wrote positively about the record saying that "it's packed with ephemeral, slow-burning energy. But don't be fooled: there are some legit bangers on this record."

Track listing
Credits taken from Qobuz.

Personnel
Credits adapted from Tidal.

 Jaira Burns – lead vocals 
 Noise Club – production 
 Chris Gehringer − mixing, mastering, studio personnel 
 Gavin Finn − engineering, studio personnel 
 Tony Maserati − mixing, studio personnel 
 ADP − production 
 Matt Colton − mixing assistance, studio personnel 
 Eric J Dubowsky − mixing, studio personnel 
 Charles Stephens III − production 
 Ryan Tedder − production 
 Erik Madrid − mixing, studio personnel 
 Jorge Gutierrez − mixing assistance, studio personnel 
 Aalias − production 
 Matt Colton − mastering, studio personnel 
 Mitch McCarthy − mixing, studio personnel 
 Nolan Lambroza − production 
 Stargate − production 
 Chris Athens − mastering, studio personnel 
 Emanuel "Eman" Kiriakou − production 
 Andrew Goldstein − production 
 Emile Ghantous − production 
 Keith Hetrick − production, co-production 
 Jay Weathers − production, co-production

Release history

References

2018 debut EPs
Albums produced by Emanuel Kiriakou
Albums produced by Ryan Tedder
Albums produced by Stargate
Interscope Records EPs
Pop music EPs